John Llewellyn may refer to:

John Llewellyn (fencer) (born 1957), British fencer who appeared at three Olympic Games
John Llewellyn (racing driver), British former auto racing driver
Sir John Llewellyn (academic), academic administrator in New Zealand and Great Britain
John Anthony Llewellyn (1933–2013), British-born American scientist and NASA astronaut
Sir John Dillwyn-Llewellyn, 1st Baronet (1836–1927), Welsh Conservative Member of Parliament
John Seys-Llewellyn (1912–2003), Welsh barrister and judge
John Llewellin, 1st Baron Llewellin (1893–1957), British army officer and politician

See also
John Llewelyn (born 1928), Welsh-born British philosopher
John Dillwyn Llewelyn (1810–1882), Welsh botanist and pioneer photographer